Second Temple Judaism refers to the Jewish religion as it developed during the Second Temple period, which began with the construction of the Second Temple around 516 BCE and ended with the Roman siege of Jerusalem in 70 CE.

The Second Temple period was marked by the emergence of multiple religious currents as well as extensive cultural, religious, and political developments among Jews. It saw the progression of the Hebrew Bible canon, the synagogue, and Jewish eschatology. Additionally, the rise of Christianity began in the final years of the Second Temple period.

According to Jewish tradition, authentic prophecy ceased during the early years of the Second Temple period; this left Jews without their version of divine guidance at a time when they felt most in need of support and direction. Under Hellenistic rule, the growing Hellenization of Judaism became a source of resentment among Jewish traditionalists, who clung to strict monotheistic beliefs. Opposition to Hellenistic influence on Jewish religious and cultural practices was a major catalyst for the Maccabean Revolt against the Seleucid Empire. Following the establishment of the Hasmonean dynasty, traditional Judaism was reasserted by the Maccabees across the Land of Israel as they expanded their independent territory. The later years of the Second Temple period saw the development of a number of Jewish messianic ideas. From  to 30 CE, five successive generations of the Zugot headed the Jews' spiritual affairs; it was during this period that the sects of the Pharisees, Sadducees, Essenes, Zealots, and early Christianity were formed.

History

Periods
(Note: dates and periods are in many cases approximate and/or conventional)
 Persian, 539–333 BCE
 Hellenistic, 333–164 BCE 
 Ptolemaic, 301–200 BCE
 Seleucid, 200–164 BCE
 Hasmonean, 164–37 BCE
 Herodian, 37 BCE – 6 CE
 Herodian Kingdom of Judea, 37 BCE – 4 BCE
 Herodian Tetrarchy, 4 BCE – 6 CE
 Roman, 6 CE – 70 CE

Jerusalem and Yehud
The period of the First Temple ended in 586 BCE when the Babylonian king Nebuchadnezzar II captured Jerusalem, destroyed the Temple of Solomon, and deported the elite of the population to Babylon (the "Babylonian exile"). In 539 BCE Babylon itself fell to the Persian conqueror Cyrus, and in 538 BCE the exiles were permitted to return to Yehud medinata, as the Persian province of Judah was known. The Temple is commonly said to have been rebuilt in the period 520–515 BCE, but it seems probable that this is an artificial date chosen so that 70 years could be said to have passed between the destruction and the rebuilding, fulfilling a prophecy of Jeremiah.

The end of the Persian period is conventionally dated from Alexander the Great's conquest of the Mediterranean coast in 333/332 BCE. His empire disintegrated after his death, and Judea, including Jerusalem, fell to the Ptolemies, the descendants of one of Alexander's generals who ruled Egypt. In 200 BCE Israel and Judea were captured by the Seleucids, the descendants of another Greek general ruling Syria. Around 167 BCE, for reasons that remain obscure, the Seleucid king Antiochus IV Epiphanes attempted to suppress Jewish worship; this provoked a Jewish revolt (the Maccabean Revolt) that eventually led to the effective end of Greek control over Jerusalem.

Hasmonean Judea was a client kingdom of the Romans, and in the 1st century BCE the Romans first replaced them with their protege Herod the Great, and, on Herod's death in 6 CE, made Judea a province under Rome's direct rule. Heavy taxes under the Romans and insensitivity towards the Jewish religion led to revolt (the First Jewish–Roman War, 66–73 CE), and in 70 CE the Roman general (and later emperor) Titus captured Jerusalem and destroyed the Temple, bringing an end to the Second Temple period.

The diaspora
The Jewish exiles in Babylon were not slaves or prisoners, nor were they badly treated, and when the Persians gave permission for them to return to Jerusalem the majority elected to remain where they were. They and their descendants formed the diaspora, a large community of Jews living outside Judea, and the 1st century CE historian Josephus reported that there were more Jews in Syria (meaning the Seleucid empire) than in any other land. There was also a significant Egyptian diaspora, although the Jews of Egypt were immigrants, not deportees, "... attracted by Hellenistic culture, eager to win the respect of the Greeks and to adapt to their ways" (John J. Collins, "Between Athens and Jerusalem"). The Egyptian diaspora was slow to develop, but in the Hellenistic period it came to outstrip the Babylonian community in importance. In addition to these major centres there were Jewish communities throughout the Hellenistic and subsequently the Roman world, from North Africa to Asia Minor and Greece and in Rome itself.

The Samaritans
The separation between Jews of Jerusalem and those of Samaria was a long and protracted process. For most of the Second Temple period Samaria was larger, richer, and more populous than Judea—down to about 164 BCE there were probably more Samaritans than Judeans living in Palestine. They had their own temple on Mount Gerizim near Shechem and regarded themselves as the only true Israel, the remnant left behind when Israel was deceived by the wicked priest Eli to leave Gerizim and worship at Jerusalem. Second Temple Judeans regarded them as foreign converts and the offspring of mixed marriages, and therefore of impure blood. Relations between the two communities were often strained, but the definitive break dates from the destruction of the Gerizim temple and of Shechem by a Hasmonean king in the late 2nd century BCE; before that the Samaritans seem to have regarded themselves as part of the wider Jewish community, but afterwards they denounced the Jerusalem temple as completely unacceptable to God.

Literature
In recent decades it has become increasingly common among scholars to assume that much of the Hebrew Bible was assembled, revised and edited in the 5th century BCE to reflect the realities and challenges of the Persian era. The returnees had a particular interest in the history of Israel: the written Torah (the books of Genesis, Exodus, Leviticus, Numbers and Deuteronomy), for example, may have existed in various forms during the Monarchy (the period of the kingdoms of Israel and Judah), but according to the documentary hypothesis, it was in the Second Temple that it was edited and revised into something like its current form, and the Chronicles, a new history written at this time, reflects the concerns of the Persian Yehud in its almost exclusive focus on Judah and the Temple.

Prophetic works were also of particular interest to the Persian-era authors, with some works being composed at this time (the last ten chapters of Isaiah and the books of Haggai, Zechariah, Malachi and perhaps Joel) and the older prophets edited and reinterpreted. The corpus of Wisdom books saw the composition of Job, parts of Proverbs, and possibly Ecclesiastes, while the book of Psalms was possibly given its modern shape and division into five parts at this time (although the collection continued to be revised and expanded well into Hellenistic and even Roman times).

In the Hellenistic period, the scriptures were translated into Greek by the Jews of the Egyptian diaspora, who also produced a rich literature of their own covering epic poetry, philosophy, tragedy and other forms. Less is known of the Babylonian diaspora, but the Seleucid period produced works such as the court tales of the Book of Daniel (chapters 1-6 of Daniel - chapters 7-12 were a later addition), and the books of Tobit and Esther. The eastern Jews were also responsible for the adoption and transmission of the Babylonian and Persian apocalyptic tradition seen in Daniel.

The documentary hypothesis is disputed by some Christians.

Worship and the Hebrew community

Israel as a holy community
The Hebrew Bible represents the beliefs of only a small portion of the Israelite community, the members of a tradition that insisted on the exclusive worship of Yahweh, who collected, edited and transmitted the biblical texts, and who saw their mission in a return to Jerusalem where they could impose their vision of genealogical purity, orthodox worship, and codified law on the local population. In the earliest stages of the Persian period, the returnees insisted on a strict separation between themselves ("Israel") and the Judeans who had never gone into exile ("Canaanites"), to the extent of prohibiting intermarriage; this was presented in terms of religious purity, but there may have been a practical concern for land ownership. The concept of the Jewish people as a people chosen by God gave rise to innumerable break-away movements, each declaring that it alone represented Jewish holiness; the most extreme example was the Qumran sect (the Essenes), but Christianity too began as a Jewish sect that saw itself as the "true Israel".

Textual Judaism: priests and scribes
Second Temple Judaism was centered not on synagogues, which began to appear only in the 3rd century BCE, but the reading and study of scripture, the Temple itself, and a cycle of continual animal sacrifice. Torah, or ritual law, was also important, and the Temple priests were responsible for teaching it, but the concept of scripture developed only slowly. While the written Torah (the Pentateuch) and the Prophets were accepted as authoritative by the 1st century CE, beyond this core the different Jewish groups continued to accept different groups of books as authoritative.

The priesthood and the autonomy of Yehud
The priesthood underwent profound changes with the Second Temple. Under the First Temple, the priesthood had been subordinate to the kings, but in the Second Temple, with the monarchy and even the state no longer available, they became independent. The priesthood under the High Priest (a position largely unknown in earlier times) became the governing authority, making the province of Yehud in a sense a theocracy, although it seems unlikely that it had any more autonomy than was typical of the empire as a whole. In the Hellenistic period, the High Priest continued to play a vital role with both cultic and civic obligations, and the office reached its height under the Hasmoneans, who made themselves priest-kings. Both Herod and the Romans severely reduced the importance of the office, appointing and deposing High Priests to suit their purposes.

Intellectual currents

Monotheism
There was a sharp break between ancient Israelite religion and the Judaism of the Second Temple. Pre-exilic Israel was polytheistic; Asherah was probably worshiped as Yahweh's consort, within his temples in Jerusalem, Bethel, and Samaria, and a goddess called the Queen of Heaven, probably a fusion of Astarte and the Mesopotamian goddess Ishtar, was also worshiped. Baal and Yahweh coexisted in the early period but were considered irreconcilable after the 9th century. The worship of Yahweh alone, the concern of a small party in the monarchic period, only gained ascendancy in the exilic and early post-exilic period, and it was only then that the very existence of other gods was denied.

Messianism and the end times
The Persian period saw the development of expectation in a future human king who would rule purified Israel as God's representative at the end of time – that is, a messiah. The first to mention this were Haggai and Zechariah, both prophets of the early Persian period. They saw the messiah in Zerubbabel, a descendant of the House of David who seemed, briefly, to be about to re-establish the ancient royal line, or in Zerubbabel and the first High Priest, Joshua (Zechariah writes of two messiahs, one royal and the other priestly). These early hopes were dashed (Zerubabbel disappeared from the historical record, although the High Priests continued to be descended from Joshua), and thereafter there are merely general references to a Messiah of (meaning descended from) David.

Wisdom and the Word
Wisdom, or hokmah, implied the learning acquired by study and formal education: "those who can read and write, those who have engaged in study, and who know literature, are the wise par excellence" (Grabbe, 2010, p. 48). The literature associated with this tradition includes the books of Job, Psalms, Proverbs, Ecclesiastes, Song of Songs, Sirach and the Wisdom of Solomon, the so-called Sapiential books.

Widespread adoption of Torah law

In his seminal Prolegomena zur Geschichte Israels, Julius Wellhausen argued that Judaism as a religion based on widespread observance Torah law first emerged in the year 444 BCE when, according to the biblical account provided in the Book of Nehemiah (chapter 8), a priestly scribe named Ezra read a copy of the Mosaic Torah before the populace of Judea assembled in a central Jerusalem square. Wellhausen believed that this narrative should be accepted as historical because it sounds plausible, noting "The credibility of the narrative appears on the face of it." Following Wellhausen, most scholars throughout the 20th and early 21st centuries have accepted that widespread Torah observance began sometime around the middle of the 5th century BCE.

More recently, Yonatan Adler has argued that in fact there is no surviving evidence to support the notion that the Torah was widely known, regarded as authoritative, and put into practice, any time prior to the middle of the 2nd century BCE. Adler explored the likelihhood that Judaism, as the widespread practice of Torah law by Jewish society at large, first emerged in Judea during the reign of the Hasmonean dynasty, centuries after the putative time of Ezra.

Proselytism 
The issue of conversion to Judaism and Jewish proselytism in Second Temple Judaism has occupied many scholars from the 19th century to the present day. Research has not yet yielded a consensus among scholars: some believe that Judaism was a missionary religion, and others reject their conclusions. Some assess that the conversion of Gentiles to Judaism in the Hellenistic and Roman periods was a wide-ranging phenomenon of great demographic importance, while others doubt this. Modern research does not have the possibility to determine how many Gentiles converted, and it is not possible to determine what their share was in the total Jewish population.

Some scholars suggested that the saying attributed to Jesus on the Gospel of Matthew, "Woe to you, teachers of the law and Pharisees, you hypocrites! You travel over land and sea to win a single convert, and when you have succeeded, you make them twice as much a child of hell as you are", is an evidence of Jewish proselytism during the time period. However, scholars such as Martin Goodman, for instance, argue that phrase relates to the Pharisees' attempt to persuade Jews to join their school of thought rather than their efforts to convert non-Jews.

The emergence of Christianity

Early Christianity emerged within Second Temple Judaism during the 1st century, the key difference being the Christian belief that Jesus was the resurrected Jewish Messiah. Judaism is known to allow for multiple messiahs, the two most relevant being Messiah ben Joseph and the Messiah ben David. The idea of two messiahs — one suffering and the second fulfilling the traditional messianic role — was normal in ancient Judaism, and in fact predated Jesus.
Alan Segal has written that "one can speak of a 'twin birth' of two new Judaisms, both markedly different from the religious systems that preceded them. Not only were rabbinic Judaism and Christianity religious twins, but, like Jacob and Esau, the twin sons of Isaac and Rebecca, they fought in the womb, setting the stage for life after the womb."
 
The first Christians (the disciples or followers of Jesus) were essentially all ethnically Jewish or Jewish proselytes. In other words, Jesus was Jewish, preached to the Jewish people and called from them his first disciples. Jewish Christians regarded "Christianity" as an affirmation of every aspect of contemporary Judaism, with the addition of one extra belief — that Jesus was the Messiah. The doctrines of the apostles of Jesus brought the Early Church into conflict with some Jewish religious authorities (Acts records dispute over the resurrection of the dead, which was rejected by the Sadducees, see also Persecution of Christians in the New Testament), and possibly later led to Christians' expulsion from synagogues (see Council of Jamnia for other theories). 
While Marcionism rejected all Jewish influence on Christianity, Proto-orthodox Christianity instead retained some of the doctrines and practices of 1st-century Judaism while rejecting others, see the Historical background to the issue of Biblical law in Christianity and Early Christianity. They held the Jewish scriptures to be authoritative and sacred, employing mostly the Septuagint or Targum translations, and adding other texts as the New Testament canon developed. Christian baptism was another continuation of a Judaic practice.

Recent work by historians paints a more complex portrait of late Second Temple Judaism and early Christianity. Some historians have suggested that, before his death, Jesus created amongst his believers such certainty that the Kingdom of God and the resurrection of the dead was at hand, that with few exceptions (John ) when they saw him shortly after his execution, they had no doubt that he had been resurrected, and that the restoration of the Kingdom and resurrection of the dead was at hand. These specific beliefs were compatible with Second Temple Judaism. In the following years the restoration of the Kingdom, as Jews expected it, failed to occur. Some Christians began to believe instead that Christ, rather than simply being the Jewish messiah, was God made flesh, who died for the sins of humanity, marking the beginning of Christology.

While on one hand Jesus and the early Christians had all been ethnically Jewish, the Jews by and large continued to reject Jesus as the Messiah. This was a source of embarrassment for the Church and affected early Christianity's relationship with Judaism and the surrounding pagan traditions. The anti-Christian polemicist Celsus criticised Jews for deserting their Jewish heritage while they had claimed to hold on to it. To the Emperor Julian, Christianity was simply an apostasy from Judaism. These factors hardened Christian attitudes towards Jewry.

See also
 Hillel the Elder and Hillel and Shammai
 Intertestamental period
 Jewish Christians
 Mandaeans, may have been part of the Essene community
 Messiah ben Joseph
 Split of early Christianity and Judaism
 Third Temple
 Jerusalem during the Second Temple Period

References

Citations

Bibliography
 
 
 
 
 
 
 
 
 
 
 
 
 
 
 
 
 
 
 
 
  (ISBN is for Google Books version. Paper version )
 
 
 
 
 
 
 
 
 
 

Ancient Jewish Greek history
Ancient Jewish Persian history
Jews and Judaism in the Roman Empire
 
History of Judaism